Seaboard Air Line Railway Depot is an historic train depot in Elberton, Georgia. It was added to the National Register of Historic Places in 1986. 

It is located at North Oliver Street and Deadwyler Street.  It was built in 1910 and served as a Seaboard Air Line passenger station. The station has overhanging eaves supported by large Stick style-brackets.

The station served the SAL's Silver Comet and some passenger, mail and express trains. The last train was the Silver Comet, which was discontinued in 1969.
It is now home to the Elbert County Historical Society, and is well preserved.

See also
National Register of Historic Places listings in Elbert County, Georgia

References

National Register of Historic Places in Elbert County, Georgia
Railway stations on the National Register of Historic Places in Georgia (U.S. state)
Railway stations in the United States opened in 1910
Transportation in Elbert County, Georgia
Seaboard Air Line Railroad stations
Railway stations closed in 1971
Former railway stations in Georgia (U.S. state)